Michèle Boegner (12 August 1941 – 1 April 2021) was a French concert pianist.

At the Paris Conservatory she studied the piano with Vlado Perlemuter and chamber music with Jacques Février. She won her award at the age of fifteen. Thereupon she started an international career and won the Second Grand Prix at the George Enesco Contest at the age of seventeen. In parallel with her career, she subsequently studied at the Scaramuzza school in Buenos Aires and with Wilhelm Kempff and Geza Anda.

Michèle's career has been marked by Mozart, Haydn, Beethoven and Schubert and by French music. She has played all over the world, and in particular in Europe, as well as a soloist under the direction of most of the important conductors as in numerous solo recitals and chamber music concerts (from duo to sextet).

Her discography contains nineteen titles. In 2009 she recorded Mozart's eighteen piano sonatas and Fantasia in c minor K. 475 (released by Les Discophiles Français in 2010).

References

External links
"Official website" (French)

1941 births
2021 deaths
21st-century French women classical pianists
Musicians from Lyon
20th-century French women classical pianists